Babar District (Tifinagh: ⴱⴰⴱⴰⵔ) is a district in Khenchela Province, Algeria. It was named after its capital, Babar.

Municipalities
The district is further divided into 1 municipality:
 Babar

Districts of Khenchela Province